George Nicholls Jr. (May 5, 1897 – November 13, 1939), also known as George Nichols Jr., was an American director and editor during the 1930s. Born to show business parents, and son of prolific actor and director George Nichols, he entered the film industry at the tail end of the silent film era, working as an editor for the Paramount Famous Lasky Corporation. After moving to RKO Pictures in 1933, Nicholls shortly began directing films by the end of the year. His career was cut short when he died in a car accident while driving to the location of his final film.

Life and career
Born George Alberti Nichols on May 5, 1897, in San Francisco, his father was the American actor and director George Nichols, and his mother was the actress Viola Alberti. While his father was working at Biograph Studios, Nicholls made his film debut, acting in shorts during the 1910s. In 1912, as a child actor he had the lead in the comedy short Pa's Medicine at the Thanhouser Film Corporation, a film directed by his father.

He returned to the film industry behind the camera in 1928, as the editor on the Paramount film Wife Savers, directed by Ralph Ceder, and starring Wallace Beery, Raymond Hatton, ZaSu Pitts. For the next five years he worked primarily at Paramount as an editor. While at Paramount, he went by George Nichols Jr. When he moved to RKO in 1933, he began using the original spelling of his last name, and became known as George Nicholls Jr. His first film at his new studio was Sweepings, directed by John Cromwell. By the end of the year he was tapped to be an associate director to Thornton Freeland on Flying Down to Rio, the first film to team Fred Astaire with Ginger Rogers. The following year he would make his directorial debut, co-directing Finishing School with Wanda Tuchock (who was also directing her first film).

For the remainder of the decade, he worked consistently as a director at RKO, although occasionally loaned out to other studios such as Republic and 20th-Century. He directed several notable films, including: Anne of Green Gables (1934), starring Anne Shirley (who took her stage name from this point on from the character she portrayed in this film) and Tom Brown; 1935's The Return of Peter Grimm, starring Lionel Barrymore, Helen Mack, Edward Ellis, and Donald Meek; the 1936 sound remake of the 1918 silent film of the same name, M'liss, starring Anne Shirley again, this time with John Beal; and the 1939 Western, Man of Conquest, starring Richard Dix. Nicholls directed the retakes on the John Ford film, The Plough and the Stars in 1937.

In 1939 he was working on the action film The Marines Fly High. On November 13, while driving to the film's location shoot at Lake Sherwood, his car ran off the road on Coldwater Canyon Drive, killing him instantly. His sister-in-law, who was traveling with him, sustained non-serious injuries. Following a funeral service in Hollywood, his body was cremated.

Filmography
(as per AFI's database)

References

External links
 

1897 births
1939 deaths
20th-century American male actors
American male silent film actors
Film directors from San Francisco
American film editors